Anne Katrine Holten  (born 31 January 1972) is a Norwegian sport wrestler.

She won gold medals at the 1987 World Wrestling Championships and the 1989 World Wrestling Championships. She represented the club Kristiansund AK.

References

1972 births
Living people
Norwegian female sport wrestlers
Sportspeople from Kristiansund
World Wrestling Championships medalists
20th-century Norwegian women
21st-century Norwegian women